

Language 

 Kauravi dialect, also known as Dehlavi, spoken around Delhi and the basis of Hindostani language

Personal names 
Dehlavi is a toponymic surname (nisba) for people from Delhi (formerly Dehli). Notable people with the surname include:

 'Abd al-Haqq al-Dehlawi (1551–1642), Indian Islamic scholar from Delhi, author of Ma'arij-ul-Nabuwwah
 Abdul Rehman Jilani Dehlvi (1615–1677), Indian Sufi saint of the Qadri tariqa
 Ahmad Saeed Dehlavi (1888–1959), Indian Muslim scholar, writer and freedom fighter
 Ali Muhammad Khan Dehlavi (1876–), Indian politician, educationist, Muslim reformer
 Amir Khosrow Dehlavi or Amir Khusrau (1253–1325), noted Indian Sufi saint and poet
 Bedil Dehlavi or Abdul-Qādir Bedil (1642–1720), Indian poet in Persian
 Bekhud Dehlvi (1863–1955), Indian Urdu poet and writer of ghazals
 Daagh Dehlvi (1831–1905), 19th-century Indian Urdu poet
 Faaiz Dehlvi (1609-1738), Indian noble and poet in Urdu and Persian
 Ghulam Ali Dehlavi (1743–1824), 19th-century Indian Sufi leader
 Gulzar Dehlvi (1926–2020), Indian Urdu poet
 Hafizur Rahman Wasif Dehlavi (1910–1987), Indian Muslim scholar, jurist and writer, and former rector of Madrasa Aminia
 Hossein Dehlavi (1927–2019), Iranian composer, ancestors settled in Delhi during Mughal-era
 Houman Dehlavi (born 1971), Iranian musician
 Jamil Dehlavi (born 1944), British-Pakistani filmmaker, brother of Saidulla Khan Dehlavi
 Khalish Dehlavi (born 1935), Indian Urdu poet
 Kifayatullah Dehlawi (1875–1952), Islamic scholar and Grand Mufti of India
 Maulana Abdu Salam Niazi Dehlvi (–1966), Indian perfumer and Sufi scholar
 Mir Hasan Dehlavi (1736–1786), 18th-century Indian Urdu poet
 Mirza Muhammad Kamil Dehlavi (–1819/20), Indian Shiite author
 Mumtaz Jehan Begum Dehlavi or Madhubala (1933–1969), noted Indian film actress
 Nasiruddin Chiragh Dehlavi (1274–1337), 13th-century Indian Sufi saint
 Nazir Ahmad Dehlvi (1836–1912), Indian educationist, reformer and Urdu writer, best known for the social novel Mirat-ul-Uroos
 Sadia Dehlvi (1957–2020), Indian writer and columnist from Delhi
 Sadruddin Khan Azurda Dehlawi (1804–1868), Grand Mufti of Delhi, leader of the Indian Rebellion of 1857
 Saidulla Khan Dehlavi (1941–2014), Pakistani diplomat, brother of Jamil Dehlavi
 Shah Abdul Aziz Dehlavi (1746–1824), Indian Islamic scholar, reformer and Naqshbandi Sufi, son of Shah Waliullah Dehlawi
 Shah Abdur Rahim Dehlavi (1644-1719), Islamic scholar and a writer, compiler of Fatawa-e-Alamgiri, father of Shah Waliullah Dehlawi
 Shah Ismail Dehlvi (1779–1831), Indian Islamic scholar and Sufi
 Shah Muhammad Ishaq Dehlawi (1783–1846), Indian Muslim scholar of hadith studies
 Shah Waliullah Dehlawi (1703–1762), Indian Islamic reformer, father of Shah Abdul Aziz Dehlavi
 Shahid Ahmad Dehlvi (1906–1967), Pakistani author and translator, grandson of Nazir Ahmad Dehlvi
 Soz Dehlvi (1720–1799), Indian Urdu poet in the court of Oudh
 Syed Ahmad Dehlvi (1846–1918), Indian Muslim scholar, educationist and linguist, editor of the Urdu dictionary Farhang e Asifiya
 Syed Nazeer Husain Dehlavi (1805–1902), Indian Muslim scholar of the reformist Ahl-i Hadith movement
 Syed Muhammad Dehlavi, Pakistani Shiite scholar
 Tabish Dehlvi (1913–2004), Pakistani writer
 Zakaullah Dehlvi (1832–1910), Indian scholar and historian, writer of the Urdu chronicle Tarikh-e-Hindustan

See also 
 Delhi (disambiguation)
 List of people from Delhi

People from Delhi
Toponymic surnames
Indian surnames
Nisbas
Arabic-language surnames
Persian-language surnames
Urdu-language surnames